Andrea Peana (born 12 February 1986) is an Italian football player. He plays for Arzachena.

Club career
He made his Serie B debut for Triestina in the 2007–08 season.

On 11 August 2019, he returned to Arzachena.

References

External links
 

1986 births
People from Alghero
Footballers from Sardinia
Living people
Italian footballers
Association football defenders
Cagliari Calcio players
U.S. Triestina Calcio 1918 players
F.C. Crotone players
A.S.D. Portogruaro players
Olbia Calcio 1905 players
F.C. Grosseto S.S.D. players
Nuorese Calcio players
Arzachena Academy Costa Smeralda players
Serie B players
Serie C players
Serie D players
Pol. Alghero players